Abadazad is an American comic book written by J.M.DeMatteis and drawn by Mike Ploog, with color by Nick Bell. Published in 2004 by Crossgen Comics to rave reviews, the series halted after three issues when Crossgen went out of business.

After Disney acquired Abadazad, along with the rest of CrossGen's intellectual property, the story was resumed in June 2006 in a hybrid format: a children's book series that combines sequential art segments alternating with prose segments. Originally meant to be a tetralogy, Disney Publishing changed plans to eight Abadazad volumes, of which only three were published.

Story
Abadazad is a magical land that Kate Jameson — a surly, cynical fourteen-year-old child — has only known through a series of famous fantasy novels written a century ago by one Franklin O. Davies. When Kate suddenly finds herself journeying through the real Abadazad in search of her beloved younger brother, Matt — who vanished five years earlier — she discovers that the truth of Abadazad is far stranger, and more amazing, than fiction. She is guided to enter Abadazad by Little Martha, the protagonist of the novels which she had read, and is given cause to confront the villain known as Lanky Man, to whom is ascribed the disappearance of Matt.

Book series
Abadazad: The Road to Inconceivable (June 2006)
Abadazad: The Dream Thief (June 2006) 	
Abadazad: The Puppet, the Professor, and the Prophet (July 2007, UK only)
Abadazad: Historcery (cancelled)

Book 3, originally scheduled for US publication, appeared only in Great Britain, while Book 4 did not appear at all. The synopsis for Book 4 from Amazon.UK reads as follows: "A groundbreaking mix of fiction and full-colour comic strip that follows a headstrong girl's journey into the bizarre fictional world of Abadazad to rescue her brother. In 'Historcery', Kate has finally gathered the group of friends she hopes will help her to rescue her brother Matt from the evil Lanky Man: the walking candle Master Wix, Professor Headstrong, the puppet Mary Annette and Mr Glum".

Although he and artist Mike Ploog originally signed up for eight volumes (with hopes for twelve, depending on sales), J.M. DeMatteis said the Abadazad book series ended after three books, and the third book would not be released in the United States. DeMatteis credits the Abadazad experience as inspiring his 2010 prose children's fantasy novel Imaginalis.

Franklin O. Davies

Davies wrote "nineteen or twenty" Abadazad books, from 1898 to 1924, starting with Little Martha in Abadazad. Other titles mentioned include Queen Ija of Abadazad, The Eight Oceans of Abadazad, Professor Headstrong of Abadazad, The Enchanted Gardens of Abadazad, The Balloonicorn of Abadazad, The Edges of Abadazad, The Battle for Abadazad and The Wretchedly Awful City of Abadazad. Most of these feature Martha Cooper, a small, determined girl who possesses the means, in the form of a blue sphere, of travelling to Abadazad at will. The historical book series reveals that Martha herself had related the stories to Davies, who had written them into books, altering the appearance and characters as he thought best suited the audience. The difference between his version of Abadazad and the version Kate encounters in person is a recurring theme throughout the story. In the original Crossgen comic book, the fictitious author's name had been Franklin O. Barrie.

References

External links
Official website
 J.M. DeMatteis and Mike Ploog at the Helsinki Book Fair  Oct. 2006
 J.M. DeMatteis and Mike Ploog on NPR'S All Things Considered Sept. 2006
Ploog illustrations for The Puppet, The Professor and the Prophet

CrossGen titles
Fantasy books by series